The Libertarian Party of Michigan is a Michigan state political party advocating a libertarian ideology and the state affiliate of the Libertarian Party of the United States. The party gained primary ballot access status in 2016 because of the vote total of presidential nominee Gary Johnson. The party lost their status since their 2018 gubernatorial nominee Bill Gelineau failed to reach that threshold in the general election.

Several Libertarians have held public office in Michigan, most at the local level. The party is a member of the Michigan Third Parties Coalition which advocates changes in Michigan's election laws.

History
Libertarian Party of Michigan was founded in 1972. In the mid-1990s, the party had 1,500 dues paying members. The party was down to 800 such members in 2004. The party had a candidate in every  congressional race in 2000 but failed to repeat in 2002. For 2004, the party had candidates in all 15 congressional races and 21 state House races in 2007, the party joined with the existing third parties to form Michigan Third Parties Coalition lobbying group.

In 2016, Libertarian presidential candidate Gary Johnson won 172,136 votes in Michigan, qualifying the state party for a primary election in 2018. The only contested election on its primary ballot that year was for governor with Grand Rapids businessman Bill Gelineau and retired teacher John Tatar.

In April 2020, U.S. Representative Justin Amash of Michigan's 3rd District joined the Libertarians, becoming the first and so far only member of Congress or federal official representing the party from any state, after leaving the Republican Party in 2019 and spending many months as an independent. He declined to seek reelection under his new affiliation and departed from Congress in 2021.

Libertarians in public office

Elected libertarians currently in public office
 Andrew LeCureaux – Hazel Park City Councilman
 Bruce Gosling – Glen Oaks Community College Board of Trustees Treasurer (elected in a non-partisan election in 2003 and has remained in office as of January 2017) As of 2021 he is Chairperson.
 Scotty Boman – Detroit Community Advisory Chairperson for District 4.
 Gregory Creswell – Detroit Community Advisory Council District 4.
 Donna Gundle-Krieg – Mancelona Township Board of Trustees.

Libertarians elected under a different party affiliation
 Justin Amash – Representative from Michigan's 3rd congressional district - Elected as a Republican

Former elected libertarians
 Mark Byrne – Port Huron Councilman, who is now active with the Unifour Area Libertarian Party in North Carolina.
 Tom Bagwell – Ypsilanti Township Park Commissioner (elected in 2008 on a partisan ballot)
 Bill Bradley – South Haven City Councilman
 Elizabeth Corder – Ypsilanti Township Park Commissioner (elected in 2016 on a partisan ballot)
 Fred Collins – Councilman for the City of Berkley, Michigan  from 1997 until he gave up his position to run for Mayor in 2005, and lost the election.
 Rev. James W. Clifton City Councilman from the town of Addison; became the first Michigan Libertarian to win public office
 David Eisenbacher – Troy City Councilman to office.
 Lawrence W. Johnson – Ypsilanti Township Park Commissioner (elected in 2008 on a partisan ballot)
 Erwin Haas – City of Kentwood 2nd Ward Commissioner
 Erin Stahl – Mayor Pro Tem  of St. Clair Shores,

Libertarians appointed to public office
 Lloyd Sherman (died 2006) – Hazel Park Brownfield Authority, Hazel Park Facilities and Infrastructure Citizens Advisory Board, Hazel Park Fence Review Board, Hazel Park Zoning Board of Appeals, Hazel Park General Building Authority.
 Will Tyler White – Vice-Chair, Meridian Charter Township Economic Development Corporation<
 Mike Saliba – Clinton Township Historical Commission

See also

References

External links
 
 Michigan 3rd Parties Coalition

Libertarianism
Michigan
Political parties in Michigan
Political parties established in 1972